Ryan Howe (born August 23, 1987) is an American professional wrestler who wrestles for the Ohio Valley Wrestling where he is the former OVW Heavyweight Champion with three reigns.

Professional wrestling career

WWE (2011)
In 2011, Howe was a contestant on Season 5 of WWE Tough Enough. Howe was eliminated on Episode 5, finishing ninth out of 14 contestants.

Ohio Valley Wrestling (2011–present)
Howe made his Ohio Valley Wrestling (OVW) debut on May 11, 2011, defeating Elvis Pridemoore in a dark match.

Total Nonstop Action Wrestling (2013)
On the June 27, 2013, episode of Impact Wrestling, Howe took part in a TNA Gut Check match losing to Adam Ohriner. On the July 4, episode of Impact Wrestling, Howe returned and was chosen for a second chance based on his performance and later faced the judges for a chance to earn a TNA contract and two judges voted no while one judge voted yes unsuccessfully earning a contract.

Championships and accomplishments
Covey Promotions
CP Cruiserweight Championship (1 time)

Ohio Valley Wrestling
OVW Heavyweight Championship (3 times)
OVW Kentucky Heavyweight Championship (1 time, current)
OVW Television Championship (3 times)

References

External links
 Ryan Howe - OVW Profile
 

1987 births
Living people
Sportspeople from Indiana
Professional wrestlers from Indiana
American male professional wrestlers
Tough Enough contestants
TNA Gut Check contestants
21st-century professional wrestlers
OVW Heavyweight Champions